This is a list of Estonian television related events from 1999.

Events
30 January - Evelin Samuel & Camille are selected to represent Estonia at the 1999 Eurovision Song Contest with their song "Diamond of Night". They are selected to be the fifth Estonian Eurovision entry during Eurolaul held at the ETV Studios in Tallinn.

Debuts

Television shows

1990s
Õnne 13 (1993–present)

Ending this year

Births

Deaths